Arare may refer to:
Norimaki Arare or Arale Norimaki, the main character in Dr. Slump media
Arare (food), a bite-sized Japanese rice cracker
Japanese destroyer Arare, a warship sunk in 1942